Tyne Valley may refer to:

Tyne Valley, Prince Edward Island, Canada
River Tyne in Northern England
The areas on the banks of the River Tyne to the west of Newcastle, roughly corresponding to Tynedale